Montmorency Township is located in Whiteside County, Illinois. As of the 2010 census, its population was 2,612 and it contained 1,027 housing units. It is located south of the city of Rock Falls.

Geography

Demographics

References

External links
City-data.com
Whiteside County Official Site

Townships in Whiteside County, Illinois
Townships in Illinois